Ripsaw is a musical genre which originated in the Turks and Caicos Islands, specifically in the Middle and North Caicos. A very closely related variant, rake-and-scrape, is played in the Bahamas. Its most distinctive characteristic is the use of the common handsaw as the primary instrument, along with various kinds of drums, box guitar, concertina, triangle and accordion.

The saw is played by scraping an object, usually an old knife blade, along the saw's teeth, while bending the saw to produce a different timbre.  The sound is similar to a paper being ripped, and is believed to be the origin of the term ripsaw.  Rake-and-scrape derives from the method used by a player to create sound from the saw.

Though little is known for certain about ripsaw's genesis, two major theories include that the instrument was played to imitate the sound of the güiro, a Dominican and Haiti percussion instrument, and that Loyalist colonists in the United States brought their African slaves to the islands and these slaves invented the ripsaw to imitate the sound of the shekere instrument.

In the Bahamas, Cat Island is the only place to celebrate rake-and-scrape on a large scale.  During June's Labour Day celebration, the island holds a Cat Island Rake and Scrape festival.

References

External links 
 Music in the Turks and Caicos Islands at Turks and Caicos Tourist Board
 Ripsaw Music & Our Musical Heritage, by David Bowen, Cultural Officer, Turks & Caicos Tourist Board.

Bahamian music
Anglophone Caribbean music
Music of British Overseas Territories
Turks and Caicos Islands culture